The 1971 All-SEC football team consists of American football players selected to the All-Southeastern Conference (SEC) chosen by various selectors for the 1971 NCAA University Division football season. Alabama won the conference.

Offensive selections

Receivers 
 Terry Beasley, Auburn (AP-1, UPI)
 Dick Schmaiz, Auburn (AP-2, UPI)
 Andy Hamilton, LSU (AP-1)
 Carlos Alvarez, Florida (AP-2)

Tight ends 

 David Bailey, Alabama (AP-1)
Jim Poole, Ole Miss (UPI)
 Eric Hoggatt, Ole Miss (AP-2)

Tackles 
 Tom Nash, Georgia (AP-1, UPI)
 Jim Krapf, Alabama (AP-1)
John Hannah, Alabama (UPI)
 Danny Speigner, Auburn (AP-2)
Fred Abbott, Florida (AP-2)

Guards 
 Royce Smith, Georgia (AP-1, UPI)
Mike Demarie, LSU (AP-2, UPI)
 John Hannah, Alabama (AP-1)
Bill Emendorfer, Tennessee (AP-2)

Centers 
Jimmy Grammar, Alabama (AP-2, UPI)
 Kendall Keith, Georgia (AP-1)

Quarterbacks 

 Pat Sullivan, Auburn (College Football Hall of Fame)  (AP-1, UPI)
 John Reaves, Florida (AP-2)

Running backs 
 Johnny Musso, Alabama (AP-1, UPI)
 Curt Watson, Tennessee (AP-2, UPI)
 Art Cantrelle, LSU (AP-1)
Andy Johnson, Georgia (AP-2)

Defensive selections

Ends 

 Robin Parkhouse, Alabama  (AP-1, UPI)
 Mixon Robinson, Georgia (AP-2, UPI)
Bob Brown, Auburn(AP-1)
 George Abernethy, Vanderbilt (AP-2)

Tackles 
Ronnie Estay, LSU (AP-1, UPI)
Tommy Yearout, Auburn (AP-2, UPI)
Elmer Allen, Ole Miss (AP-1)
Chuck Heard, Georgia (AP-2)

Linebackers 
 Joe Federspiel, Kentucky (AP-1, UPI)
Chip Wisdom, Georgia (AP-2, UPI)
Jackie Walker, Tennessee (AP-2, UPI)
 Ray Nellies, Tennessee  (AP-1)
 Tom Surias, Alabama (AP-1)
Jeff Rouzie, Alabama (AP-2)
Paul Dongieux, Ole Miss (AP-2)

Backs 
Bobby Majors, Tennessee (AP-1, UPI)
Steve Higginbotham, Alabama (AP-1, UPI)
Buzy Rosenberg, Georgia (AP-1, UPI)
Frank Dowsing, Miss. St. (AP-1)
Tommy Casanova, LSU (College Football Hall of Fame)  (UPI)
Johnny Simmons, Auburn (AP-2)
Conrad Graham, Tennessee (AP-2)
Ken Stone, Vanderbilt (AP-2)

Special teams

Kicker 

 George Hunt, Tennessee (AP-1)
Jay Michaelson, LSU (AP-2)

Punter 

 David Beverly, Auburn (AP-1)
Greg Gantt, Alabama (AP-2)

Key

AP = Associated Press

UPI = United Press International

Bold = Consensus first-team selection by both AP and UPI

See also
1971 College Football All-America Team

References

All-SEC
All-SEC football teams